The 2004–05 Crown Prince Cup was the 30th season of the Saudi premier knockout tournament since its establishment in 1957. It started with the qualifying rounds on 8 December 2004 and concluded with the final on 13 May 2005.

Al-Ittihad were the defending champions, but were eliminated in the semi-finals by Al-Hilal.

Al-Hilal won their 5th title following a 2–1 win over Al-Qadisiyah in the final.

The winner of the Crown Prince Cup earns automatic qualification to the 2006 AFC Champions League group stages. However, as Al-Hilal qualified for the AFC Champions League as league winners, Al-Shabab, the league runners-up, took this Champions League spot.

Qualifying rounds
All of the competing teams that are not members of the Premier League competed in the qualifying rounds to secure one of 4 available places in the Round of 16. The qualifying competition began on 8 December 2004. First Division sides Al-Khaleej, Al-Raed, and Najran, and Second Division side Al-Watani qualified.

First round

Second round

Final Round

Round of 16
The Round of 16 fixtures were played on 15, 16, 17 and 18 February 2005. All times are local, AST (UTC+3).

Quarter-finals
The Quarter-finals fixtures were played on 3, 4, 5 and 6 March 2005. All times are local, AST (UTC+3).

Semi-finals
The Semi-finals first legs were played on 25 and 26 April 2005 while the second legs were played on 29 and 30 April 2005. All times are local, AST (UTC+3).

|}

Matches

Al-Qadisiyah won 3–2 on aggregate.

Al-Hilal won 2–1 on aggregate.

Final
The final was held on 13 May 2005. All times are local, AST (UTC+3).

Top goalscorers

See also
 2004–05 Saudi Premier League
 2006 AFC Champions League

References

Saudi Crown Prince Cup seasons
2004–05 domestic association football cups
Crown Prince Cup